Aleksandar Bajevski (born 8 December 1979) is a Macedonian international footballer who has retired from professional football in 2012, after a short spell at FK Radnički Niš in Serbian SuperLiga.

Club career
Born in Skopje, SR Macedonia, his previous clubs include OFK Beograd, Ferencváros, Al-Ahli Doha. Bajevski is a trainee of Vardar Skopje. At the beginning of March 2007, he was released from Górnik Łęczna on his own request. In 2007, he signed a contract with the Belgian team KV Mechelen. In the summer of 2012, he returned to Serbia and joined FK Radnički Niš.

International career
He made his senior debut for Macedonia in a June 2003 European Championship qualification match against Liechtenstein and has earned a total of 5 caps, scoring no goals including 2006 FIFA World Cup qualification. His final international was a March 2005 FIFA World Cup qualification match against Romania.

Honours

Club honors
Vardar Skopje
1. MFL (1): 2001–02

Ferencvárosi
Szuperkupa (1): 2004

References

External links
 
 

1979 births
Living people
Footballers from Skopje
Association football forwards
Macedonian footballers
North Macedonia youth international footballers
North Macedonia under-21 international footballers
North Macedonia international footballers
FK Vardar players
OFK Beograd players
Győri ETO FC players
BFC Siófok players
Ferencvárosi TC footballers
Górnik Łęczna players
Al Ahli SC (Doha) players
K.V. Mechelen players
FC DAC 1904 Dunajská Streda players
Flamurtari Vlorë players
Pelita Bandung Raya players
FK Radnički Niš players
Macedonian First Football League players
Nemzeti Bajnokság I players
Qatar Stars League players
Belgian Pro League players
Slovak Super Liga players
Kategoria Superiore players
Liga 1 (Indonesia) players
I liga players
Macedonian expatriate footballers
Expatriate footballers in Serbia
Macedonian expatriate sportspeople in Serbia
Expatriate footballers in Serbia and Montenegro
Macedonian expatriate sportspeople in Serbia and Montenegro
Expatriate footballers in Hungary
Macedonian expatriate sportspeople in Hungary
Expatriate footballers in Poland
Macedonian expatriate sportspeople in Poland
Expatriate footballers in Qatar
Macedonian expatriate sportspeople in Qatar
Expatriate footballers in Belgium
Macedonian expatriate sportspeople in Belgium
Expatriate footballers in Slovakia
Macedonian expatriate sportspeople in Slovakia
Expatriate footballers in Albania
Macedonian expatriate sportspeople in Albania
Expatriate footballers in Indonesia
Macedonian expatriate sportspeople in Indonesia